Neil Ian Orr (born 13 May 1959) is a Scottish former professional footballer, who played as a defender.

Orr, who was capped for Scotland under-21s and the Scottish Football League XI, played for Morton for seven years, racking up 196 appearances. He joined West Ham United in January 1982 for £400,000, making his debut on 9 January 1982 against Manchester United.

He made a total of 175 league and cup appearances for West Ham, scoring five goals. He went on to play for Hibernian and St Mirren, before ending his career at Queen of the South.

Following his retirement from professional football, Orr spent time coaching in summer camps in the United States, before moving back to Scotland to take a player-manager role at Edinburgh University. As well as playing for the club, he worked as head coach and first team manager on a part-time basis of 25 hours per week for 10 months per season. He remained there for five seasons, during which time the club won the Queen's Park Shield three times, were runners up in the King Cup and were twice losing semi-finalists in the BUSA Cup. In 2000–01, EUAFC earned promotion to the East of Scotland Premier Division.

Orr left in the Summer of 2002 for a role as a Youth Development Officer with the Scottish Football Association in Midlothian. In 2011, he moved to Canberra, Australia and continued to work in football development.

He is the son of Scotland international Tommy Orr, who also played for Morton.

References

External links 

1959 births
Living people
Scottish footballers
Scotland under-21 international footballers
Scottish Football League players
English Football League players
Greenock Morton F.C. players
West Ham United F.C. players
Hibernian F.C. players
St Mirren F.C. players
Queen of the South F.C. players
Footballers from Greenock
Scottish Football League representative players
Edinburgh University A.F.C. players
Association football midfielders